Alwin de Prins (born 29 October 1978) is a former competitive swimmer who represented Luxembourg. Born in Dendermonde, Belgium, he first represented Luxembourg in 1995 at the European Championships in Vienna.

He swam in the 50 metre, 100 metre and 200 metre breaststroke and represented Luxembourg at the Sydney Olympics in 2000, the Athens Olympics in 2004 and the 2008 Summer Olympics in Beijing. His trainers were Klaus Juergen Ohk and Ingolf Bender (federation coach).

De Prins is a member of the board of directors and the Technical Commission of the Luxembourg Swimming Federation as well as member of the Athletic Commission of the Luxembourg National Olympic Committee. He is also secretary-general of the Luxembourg Association of Olympians.

In September 2008 he announced his retirement from competitive swimming on his blog.

Personal bests

External links 
 Alwin de Prins website

Male breaststroke swimmers
Luxembourgian male swimmers
Olympic swimmers of Luxembourg
Swimmers at the 2000 Summer Olympics
Swimmers at the 2004 Summer Olympics
Swimmers at the 2008 Summer Olympics
People from Dendermonde
1978 births
Living people